The men's RS:X was a sailing event on the Sailing at the 2012 Summer Olympics program in Weymouth and Portland National Sailing Academy. Eleven races (last one a medal race) were scheduled and completed. 38 sailors, on 38 boards, from 38 nations competed. Ten boards qualified for the medal race on course area Nothe in front of Weymouth, where each position scored double points. The gold medal was won by Dorian van Rijsselberghe who already after the ninth race had accumulated sufficient results to be certain to win the gold medal, as long as he competed in the races.

Schedule

Course areas and course configurations 

For the RS:X course areas Portland, Nothe, and West were used. The location (50° 35.19’ N, 02° 26.54’ W) points to the center Portland course area, the location (50° 36.18’ N 02° 25.98’ W) points to the center of the Nothe course area and the location (50° 37.18’ N 02° 23.55’ W) points to the center of the West course area. The target time for the course was  30 minutes for the races and 20 minutes for the medal race. The race management could choose from many course configurations.

Results

Daily standings

Further reading

References 

Men's RS:X
RS:X
Men's events at the 2012 Summer Olympics